Philipp Stölzl (born 1967 in Munich) is a German director. He began to direct music videos in the mid-1990s and directed his first feature film in 2002.

Life and career
Philipp Stölzl was trained as a set and costume designer at the Münchner Kammerspielen where he graduated in 1988. He worked in these professions in German theatres and began to work for films in 1996. He debuted as director in 1998 with the music video for Rammstein's "Du riechst so gut". He has continued to direct videos for artists such as Mick Jagger, Marius Müller-Westernhagen, Madonna, and Garbage's Bond theme "The World Is Not Enough". He has also directed commercials.

His first feature film as director was Baby from 2002. It was followed by North Face (2008), Young Goethe in Love (2010), Erased (2012) and The Physician (2013). Stölzl's work for the opera stage includes a production of Charles Gounod's Faust in 2008 and Giuseppe Verdi's Il trovatore in 2013.

Selected works

Films directed 
 1999: Morituri Te Salutant (short film)
 2002: Baby
 2008: North Face (Nordwand)
 2010: Young Goethe in Love (Goethe!)
 2012: Erased
 2013: The Physician (Der Medicus)
 2016: Winnetou (TV miniseries)
 2019: 
 2021: The Royal Game

TV series directed 

 2023: The Swarm, Adapted from the eponymous novel by Frank Schätzing, co-directed with Barbara Eder and Luke Watson.

Operas directed 
2005: Der Freischütz: Südthüringisches Staatstheater
2006: Rubens und das Nicht-Euklidische Weib: Ruhrtriennale
2007: Benvenuto Cellini: Salzburger Festspiele
2008: Faust: Theater Basel
2009: Der fliegende Holländer: Theater Basel, later-on also at the Teatro Liceo of Barcelona
2010: Rienzi: Deutsche Oper Berlin
2010: Die Fledermaus: Staatsoper Stuttgart
2011: Orpheus in der Unterwelt: Staatsoper Berlin
2012: Parsifal: Deutsche Oper Berlin
2013: Il trovatore: Theater an der Wien
2013: Il trovatore: Staatsoper Berlin
2015: Cavalleria rusticana and Pagliacci: Osterfestspiele Salzburg
2018: Frankenstein: Hamburg State Opera at Kampnagel (world premiere)
2019: Rigoletto: Bregenzer Festspiele

Plays directed 
2014: Frankenstein: Theater Basel

Music videos directed 
1997: "Stripsearch": Faith No More
1997: "I'm Leavin' U": Bootsy Collins
1997: "Du hast": Rammstein
1997: "Engel": Rammstein
1997: "Das Modell": Rammstein
1998: "Stripped": Rammstein
1998: "Du riechst so gut": Rammstein
1998: "Pretty When You Cry": VAST
1998: "Un giorno disumano": Gianna Nannini
1998: "Ich bin wieder hier": Marius Müller-Westernhagen
1998: "Die Flut": Joachim Witt
1998: "Un... ich lauf": Joachim Witt
1999: "The World Is Not Enough": Garbage
1999: "Easy": Velvet Belly
2000: "Supermann": Marius Müller-Westernhagen
2000: "Nimm mich mit 2000": Marius Müller-Westernhagen
2000: "American Pie": Madonna
2000: "Minor Earth Major Sky": A-ha
2001: "Rock'n'Roll-Übermensch": Die Ärzte
2003: "Bring Me to Life": Evanescence featuring Paul McCoy
2003: "Going Under": Evanescence
2003: "Il Canto": Luciano Pavarotti
2004: "Ich bin die Sehnsucht in dir": Die Toten Hosen
2004: "In the Shadows": The Rasmus
2004: "Everybody's Fool": Evanescence
2004: "Sick and Tired": Anastacia
2004: "Old Habits Die Hard": Mick Jagger
2005: "Eins": Marius Müller-Westernhagen
2005: "Heavy on My Heart": Anastacia
2008: "Strom": Die Toten Hosen

References

External links
 Official website 
 

1967 births
Mass media people from Munich
German music video directors
German opera directors
Living people